The yellow-breasted tailorbird (Orthotomus samarensis) is a species of passerine bird formerly placed in the "Old World warbler" assemblage, but now placed in the family Cisticolidae.

Distribution
The species is endemic to Samar, Leyte and Bohol, Philippines.
Its natural habitat is subtropical or tropical moist lowland forests.
It is threatened by habitat loss.

References

yellow-breasted tailorbird
Endemic birds of the Philippines
Fauna of Samar
Fauna of Leyte
Fauna of Bohol
yellow-breasted tailorbird
yellow-breasted tailorbird
Taxonomy articles created by Polbot